The Canton of Le Carbet is a former canton in the Arrondissement of Saint-Pierre on Martinique. It had 5,617 inhabitants (2012). It was disbanded in 2015. The canton comprised the communes of Le Carbet and Le Morne-Vert.

References

Cantons of Martinique